Maryland Route 561 (MD 561) is a state highway in the U.S. state of Maryland. Known as Hassengers Corner Road, the state highway runs  from MD 213 at Hassengers Corner north to MD 298 in Lynch in central Kent County. MD 561 was constructed in the early 1930s and widened around 1950.

Route description

MD 561 begins at an intersection with MD 213 (Augustine Herman Highway) at Hassengers Corner, a crossroads hamlet between Chestertown and Kennedyville. The two-lane undivided highway heads north to the unincorporated village of Lynch, where it intersects the Chestertown Branch of the Northern Line of the Maryland and Delaware Railroad. North of the railroad, MD 561 reaches its northern terminus at MD 298 (Lambs Meadow Road).

History
MD 561 was constructed as a macadam road by 1933. The highway was widened and resurfaced in 1949 and 1950.

Junction list

See also

References

External links

MDRoads: MD 561

561
Maryland Route 561